The Concert (or The Perils of Everybody) is a ballet made by Jerome Robbins, subsequently New York City Ballet's ballet master, to Chopin's:

  
Polonaise in A major "Military", Op. 40, No. 1
Berceuse in D flat major, Op. 57
Prelude in F minor, Op. 28, No. 18
 
Prelude in B flat minor, Op. 28, No. 16
Waltz in E minor, Op. posth.
Prelude in A major, Op. 28, No. 7
 
Prelude in E minor, Op. 28, No. 4
Mazurka in G major, KK IIa/2
Ballade No. 3 in A flat major, Op. 47

The décor was by Saul Steinberg, the costumes by Irene Sharaff and the lighting by Ronald Bates. The premiere took place at City Center of Music and Drama, New York, on Tuesday, 6 March 1956. Robbins made three subsequent ballets to Chopin's music: Dances at a Gathering (1969), In the Night (1970), and Other Dances (1976), made for Mikhail Baryshnikov and Natalia Makarova.

Original cast
Tanaquil LeClercq
Todd Bolender
Yvonne Mounsey
Robert Barnett
Wilma Curley
John Mandia
Shaun O'Brien
Patricia Savoia
Richard Thomas

Other companies (selected) 
 The Australian Ballet, premiered May 10th, 1979. Revived 1987, 2008.
 Boston Ballet
 Houston Ballet
 Pacific Northwest Ballet
 Paris Opera Ballet
 Perm Opera and Ballet Theatre, premiered April 13th 2007.
 The Royal Ballet, premiered March 4th, 1975. Revived 1976, 1978, 1979, 1980, 1981, 1986, 1987, 1988, 1999, 2000, 2001, 2007, 2014, 2018.
 Stanislavski and Nemirovich-Danchenko Moscow Academic Music Theatre, premiered July 10th, 2010.
 Vienna State Ballet
 San Francisco Ballet

References 

  
Repertory Week, NYCB, Winter season, 2008 repertory, week 1
 
Playbill, NYCB, Thursday, January 3, 2008
Playbill, NYCB, Wednesday and Friday, June 4 and 6th, 2008

Reviews 

  
NY Times, John Martin, March 7, 1956 
NY Times, Anna Kisselgoff, November 26, 1983 
 
NY Times, Jennifer Dunning, May 15, 2001 
NY Times, Alastair Macaulay, January 5, 2008 

Ballets by Jerome Robbins
Ballets to the music of Frédéric Chopin
1956 ballet premieres
Ballets designed by Irene Sharaff
Ballets designed by Ronald Bates
New York City Ballet repertory